Coronation Street: Out of Africa is a 2008 spin-off film featuring locals from the British soap opera Coronation Street, who visit the luxury resort of Sun City, South Africa. Cilla Battersby-Brown (Wendi Peters), the mother from hell, brought her son and other "son" over to Africa to win a competition for $500,000.

Plot 
The story begins soon after John Stape's (Graeme Hawley) kidnapping of Rosie Webster (Helen Flanagan) was revealed in the main show. In the soap, Fiz Brown (Jennie McAlpine) receives bad news from her mother, Cilla (Wendi Peters), about her brother, Chesney (Sam Aston), who had recently gone with her friend and ex-boyfriend Kirk Sutherland (Andrew Whyment) to South Africa to see Cilla.

Fiz arrives in South Africa to make sure that Chesney was safe. Fiz finds Chesney in a wheelchair but it soon becomes clear that Cilla had lied about Chesney's accident and that Chesney is not in fact injured.

She is both relieved and angry, when they inform her this was all a scam to win a competition to find South Africa's best family. Fiz reluctantly agrees to participate when Chesney tells her that, if they win, Cilla has agreed to return to Weatherfield and be his mum. As part of the scam, Fiz is forced to pretend to be a nun, Kirk poses as Cilla's mentally disabled son, and Cilla's boyfriend Lesedi pretends to be their stepfather.

Fiz winds up falling for an AWOL South African soldier, Alex, who is working as a hotel security guard. He asks her to stay in South Africa with him, as he could not apply for a passport for fear of being court-martialed. Fiz agrees to stay in South Africa providing that Cilla will return to Weatherfield to look after Chesney.

Unfortunately, Cilla has no intention of keeping her promise. When Chesney overhears her true plans, he ruins the prize ceremony by telling everyone of Cilla's lies. They are disqualified, and Cilla vanishes.

A heartbroken Fiz had no choice but to tell Alex goodbye. She attempts, not very successfully, to convince him as well as herself that it had only been a holiday romance anyway. After one final kiss with Alex, Fiz returned to her life on the Street. In the closing moments, Cilla is crowned "Worst Mum" on South African television.

Cast

References

2008 direct-to-video films
2008 films
O
Films set in South Africa
Television series by ITV Studios
2000s English-language films